Operand forwarding (or data forwarding) is an optimization in pipelined CPUs to limit performance deficits which occur due to pipeline stalls. A data hazard can lead to a pipeline stall when the current operation has to wait for the results of an earlier operation which has not yet finished.

Example

 ADD A B C  #A=B+C
 SUB D C A  #D=C-A

If these two assembly pseudocode instructions run in a pipeline, after fetching and decoding the second instruction, the pipeline stalls, waiting until the result of the addition is written and read.

In some cases all stalls from such read-after-write data hazards can be completely eliminated by operand forwarding:

Technical realization
The CPU control unit must implement logic to detect dependencies where operand forwarding makes sense. A multiplexer can then be used to select the proper register or flip-flop to read the operand from.

See also
Feed forward (control)

References

External links
 Introduction to Pipelining

Instruction processing